The women's 5000 metres event at the 2003 Asian Athletics Championships was held in Manila, Philippines on September 22.

Results

References

2003 Asian Athletics Championships
5000 metres at the Asian Athletics Championships
2003 in women's athletics